Ohio County is a county located in the U.S. state of Kentucky. As of the 2020 census, the population was 23,772. Its county seat is Hartford, and its largest city is Beaver Dam. The county is named after the Ohio River, which originally formed its northern boundary. It is a moist county, which means that the sale of alcohol is only legal within certain city limits.

History
Ohio County was formed in 1798 from land taken from Hardin County. Ohio was the 35th Kentucky county in order of formation. It was named for the Ohio River, which originally formed its northern boundary, but it lost its northern portions in 1829, when Daviess County and Hancock County were formed. The first settlements in Ohio County were Barnetts Station and Hartford. In January 1865, during the American Civil War, the courthouse in Hartford was burned by Kentucky Confederate cavalry because it was being used to house soldiers of the occupying Union Army. However, the county records were removed first and preserved. Ohio County is famous for its coal mines, and was the second place county producing coal in Kentucky.

Geography
It is the fifth-largest county by area in Kentucky.

Ohio County is part of the Western Coal Fields region of Kentucky. Much of Ohio County is farmland and the eastern and northern parts have rolling hills. Of the 120 counties in Kentucky, it is the fifth largest.
The county is intersected by the Rough River and the Green River runs along its southwestern border.

Adjacent counties
 Hancock County  (north)
 Breckinridge County  (northeast)
 Grayson County  (east)
 Butler County  (southeast)
 Muhlenberg County  (southwest)
 McLean County  (west)
 Daviess County  (northwest)

Demographics

As of the census of 2000, there were 22,916 people, 8,899 households, and 6,585 families residing in the county. The racial makeup of the county was 97.71% White, 0.75% Black or African American, 0.19% Native American, 0.20% Asian, 0.03% Pacific Islander, 0.45% from other races, and 0.67% from two or more races.  1.01% of the population were Hispanic or Latino of any race.

There were 8,899 households, out of which 33.00% had children under the age of 18 living with them, 61.20% were married couples living together, 9.20% had a female householder with no husband present, and 26.00% were non-families. 23.20% of all households were made up of individuals, and 11.10% had someone living alone who was 65 years of age or older.  The average household size was 2.54 and the average family size was 2.98.

In the county, the population was spread out, with 24.90% under the age of 18, 8.60% from 18 to 24, 27.50% from 25 to 44, 24.60% from 45 to 64, and 14.40% who were 65 years of age or older.  The median age was 38 years. For every 100 females there were 96.60 males.  For every 100 females age 18 and over, there were 94.20 males.

The median income for a household in the county was $29,557, and the median income for a family was $34,970. Males had a median income of $29,778 versus $19,233 for females. The per capita income for the county was $15,317.  About 13.90% of families and 17.30% of the population were below the poverty line, including 21.90% of those under age 18 and 15.70% of those age 65 or over.

7.1% of the workforce in the county comes from coal production.  In December 2019, more than half of the coal workforce, 3.5% of the counties total workforce, received WARN notices that their coal mine was closing and they would be laid off in February 2020.

Communities

Cities

 Beaver Dam
 Centertown
 Fordsville
 Hartford (county seat)
 McHenry
 Rockport

Census-designated place
 Pleasant Ridge (partially in Daviess County)

Other unincorporated places

North

 Adaburg
 Aetnaville
 Beda
 Buford
 Coffman
 Deanefield
 Haynesville
 Heflin
 Herbert
 Magan
 Narrows
 Reynolds Station
 Shreve
 Silver Beach
 Taffy

South

 Baizetown
 Ceralvo
 Cool Springs
 Cromwell
 Dundee
 Echols
 Equality
 Horse Branch
 Matanzas
 Olaton
 Prentiss
 Rosine
 Select
 Simmons
 Shultztown
 Smallhous

Media
Ohio County is part of the Owensboro radio market and the Evansville, Indiana television market area. Charter Communications is the county's primary cable television provider under the Spectrum name.

Locally-based media outlets in Ohio County include a weekly newspaper, The Ohio County Monitor, and Oldies-formatted radio station WXMZ. 

Additionally, the transmission facility of K-Love owned-and-operated radio station WEKV is located just south of Pleasant Ridge.

Notable residents
 Ramsey Carpenter, Miss Kentucky 2014, competitor for the title of Miss America 2015
 James Earp, lawman, soldier, and saloon-keeper, member of the Earp family
 Newton Earp, Civil War soldier
 Virgil Earp, lawman and soldier
 John Givens, first coach of Kentucky Colonels professional basketball team
 Bill Monroe, known as the father of bluegrass music
 George H. Tichenor, inventor of Dr. Tichenor's antiseptic
 Pendleton Vandiver, 'Uncle Pen', who inspired the music of Bill Monroe was a resident of Rosine
 Ray Chapman, only MLB player ever killed in a game
 The Crabb Family, a Southern Gospel family group

Politics

See also

 National Register of Historic Places listings in Ohio County, Kentucky

References

External links
 

 
1798 establishments in Kentucky
Kentucky counties
Populated places established in 1798